Car Trouble is a novel by Jeanne DuPrau published in 2005 about a man named Duff Pringle who travels across the country for a dream job.

Plot summary
Duff Pringle is heading across the country, aiming for his new job in technology in California's Silicon Valley. His used Ford Escort barely makes it a hundred miles from home before breaking down. He calls a car towing company to come pick him up, and when they get to the repair center, he is told the car would need to stay 2 weeks. Even though Duff has only 4 days to get to California, he checks into a motel to wait out the 3–4 days. He soon finds a note asking for someone to drive a car to St. Louis. Duff sends this person an email and gets a reply saying they would drop it off at the motel he was staying at. Duff finds Stu at a restaurant in Chipper Crossing. Stu is a hitchhiker looking to get to California too, and he asks Duff if he could come with him. Despite his appearance and behavior, Duff accepts, and they head to Saint Louis to deliver the car, a 1957 Chevrolet Bel Air, to a woman named Rosalie Hopgood. There are several characters in this story including Bonnie, an aspiring singer with a con artist for a mother (Bonnie's mom had stolen a lot of money from people and was wanted everywhere); two thugs looking for a trunkful of cash; and Moony, a terrier dog prone to carsickness.

Characters
Duffy "Duff" Pringle — a 17-year-old man looking to get to California for his job.
Stu — a hitchhiker that goes along with Duff to California.
Bonnie — a heartwarming singer that picks up with Duff and Stu in Saint Louis.
Moony — Bonnie's terrier with a tendency to get car sick.

American young adult novels
2005 American novels